Andy Hayler is an English data warehousing professional and food critic. He led the creation of the dynamic data warehousing architecture within Royal Dutch Shell that he later commercialized as the KALIDO Active Information Management software product of Kalido, the Shell subsidiary founded by Hayler in 2001. In 2002, Hayler was selected for the "Top 10 Innovators" list by the editors of Red Herring, the magazine of business technology innovation and entrepreneurism.

His "London Transport Restaurant Guide" was published by Macmillan in 1994, and his website was chosen in 2006 by The Guardian as one of the top 10 food web sites.

References

External links
 Andy Hayler's Restaurant, Food and Hotel Guide
 Andy on Enterprise Software

British food writers
British restaurant critics
Living people
Year of birth missing (living people)